Vinyl88 (or Vinyl88: Not the Best of 20 Years) is a compilation album by Die Warzau, released on September 16, 2008, by Pulseblack and Rosehip Records. It was released to celebrate the band's two decades of activity and comprised remixed versions of some of their best known songs with previously unreleased tracks. In 2009 the band agreed to license the songs "Welcome to America" (Red Metal Mix) and "Hitler's Brain" from the album to remixgalaxy.com, a website that allowed access to multi-track forms for remixing under a non-commercial personal-use license.

Track listing

Personnel
Adapted from the Vinyl88 liner notes.

Die Warzau
 Van Christie – lead vocals, instruments, production, recording, mixing
 Dan Evans – instruments, production, recording, mixing

Additional performers
 George Clinton – featuring (16)
 Chris Connelly – featuring (14)
 KMFDM – remixing (4)

Production and design
 Brian Lucey – mastering

Release history

References

External links 
 Vinyl88 at Discogs (list of releases)

2008 compilation albums
Die Warzau albums